This article contains information about the literary events and publications of 1504.

Events
Unknown dates 
Walloon poet Jean Lemaire de Belges joins the court of Margaret of Austria, Duchess of Savoy.
Aldus Manutius publishes his edition of Demosthenes in Venice.

New books

Prose
Pomponius Gauricus – De sculptura et pictura antiquorum
Jacopo Sannazaro – Arcadia (romance)

Drama
Beunans Meriasek (in Cornish)

Poetry

Pierre Gringore – Les Abus du monde
Thomas More – Fortune Verses (c. 1504)

Births
October 29 – Shin Saimdang, Korean calligrapher and poet (died 1551)
November – Giovanni Battista Giraldi ("Cinthio"), Italian novelist and poet (died 1573)
c. December – Nicholas Udall, English schoolmaster playwright (died 1556)
unknown date – Ranabai, Hindu mystical poet (died 1570)

Deaths
August 28 – John Paston, English gentleman, author and recipient of some of the Paston Letters (born 1444)
September 24 – Bartolomeo della Rocca ("Cocles"), Italian astrologer (born 1467)
unknown dates 
Petrus Haedus (Pietro Cavretto), Italian priest and writer (born 1427)
Garci Rodríguez de Montalvo, Castilian author (born c. 1450)

References

1504

1504 books
Years of the 16th century in literature